Shankarpali, shakkarpara, murali, khurma, lakdi mithai, or just simply mithai is an Indian sweet snack. It is etymologically derived from Persian Shekarpareh. Shankarpali is popular in Western India, especially in north India specially Uttar Pradesh. Its North Indian variant known as khurma or laktho is also popular in states such as Bihar, Jharkhand, and eastern Uttar Pradesh. It is also a popular sweet among the Indian diaspora in Fiji, Guyana, and Trinidad and Tobago, as well as their respective diasporas in North America, the United Kingdom, Australia and New Zealand.  It is traditionally enjoyed as a treat on Diwali. It is rich in carbohydrates, making it an instant source of energy. It can be sweet, sour or spicy depending upon how it is made.

Ingredients
Shankarpali is made from a dough of sugar, ghee, maida, and semolina.

Preparation
The mixture is made into dough and then mechanically cut into diamond-shaped units which are deep fried in ghee or butter.

Boil the milk, and dissolve the sugar in the hot milk.
Then add the ghee and salt and mix well.
Remove this mixture from the fire and add maida and rawa (slightly fried) to the mix.
Knead the dough and let it rest for 2–3 hours.
Roll the dough into a chapati with a rolling pin and cut the dough into diamond-shaped shankarpali
Fry in ghee until brown.

It is a popular snack amongst the Maharashtrian, Gujarati and Kannadiga community in India and has a long shelf-life. It is widely available in shops; people usually purchase ready-made shankarpali during the year and only prepare it at home during Diwali. This provides a livelihood for women who produce it throughout the year and market it.

Names 
 Gujarati: shakkarpara (શક્કરપારા)
 Marathi: shankarpali (शंकरपाळी)
Kannada: shankarapali/shankarapoli (ಶಂಕರಪಾಳಿ/ಶಂಕರಪೋಳಿ)
 Bengali: shakerpara (সাকেরপাড়া)
 Hindi-Urdu: shakarpare/khurma (शुक्र पारे/شکر پارے)/(खुरमा/خرمہ)
Nepali: khurma (खुर्मा)
 Fiji Hindi: lakdi mithai (लकड़ी मिठाई)
 Guyanese Hindustani: mithai (मिठाई/مٹھائی)
 Trinidadian Hindustani: khurma (खुरमा/خرمہ)

See also
Koswad
Sanna (dish)
 List of Indian snacks

References

Indian fast food
Deep fried foods